Edmar de Salles (born 15 June 1928) is a Brazilian former sports shooter. He competed in two events at the 1968 Summer Olympics.

References

1928 births
Living people
Brazilian male sport shooters
Olympic shooters of Brazil
Shooters at the 1968 Summer Olympics
Sportspeople from Belo Horizonte
Pan American Games medalists in shooting
Pan American Games bronze medalists for Brazil
Shooters at the 1963 Pan American Games
20th-century Brazilian people
21st-century Brazilian people